Joseph "Joe" Felsenstein (born May 9, 1942) is a Professor Emeritus in the Departments of Genome Sciences and Biology at the University of Washington in Seattle. He is best known for his work on phylogenetic inference, and is the author of Inferring Phylogenies, and principal author and distributor of the package of phylogenetic inference programs called PHYLIP. Closely related to his work on phylogenetic inference is his introduction of methods for making statistically independent comparisons using phylogenies.

Education
Felsenstein did his undergraduate work at the University of Wisconsin–Madison where he did undergraduate research under James F. Crow. He then did doctoral work under Richard Lewontin in the 1960s, when he was at the University of Chicago, and did a postdoc at the Institute of Animal Genetics in Edinburgh prior to becoming faculty at the University of Washington.

Research
In addition to his work in phylogenetics,
 Felsenstein is also noted for his work in theoretical population genetics, including studies on selection, migration, linkage, speciation, and the coalescent.

Awards
Felsenstein is a member of  the National Academy of Sciences. He was awarded the Darwin-Wallace Medal by the Linnean Society of London in 2008. In 2009 he was awarded the John J. Carty Award from the National Academy of Sciences.  In 2013 he was awarded the
International Prize for Biology by the Japan Society for the Promotion of Science.

The moth species Ufeus felsensteini was named in his honor.

Personal life
Felsenstein is the older brother of early personal computer designer Lee Felsenstein.

An interview covering aspects of his academic career is part of the Distinguished Faculty Interview Series  of the Department of Genome Sciences, University of Washington.

References 

Living people
University of Wisconsin–Madison alumni
Members of the United States National Academy of Sciences
Population geneticists
Evolutionary biologists
Computational phylogenetics
1942 births
University of Washington faculty
Alumni of the University of Edinburgh
Phylogenetics researchers